"Fun, Fun, Fun" is a song by the American rock band the Beach Boys from their 1964 album Shut Down Volume 2. Written by Brian Wilson and Mike Love, it was released as a single in February, backed with "Why Do Fools Fall in Love". "Fun, Fun, Fun" is one of the Beach Boys' many songs that defined the California myth.

The lyrics are about a teenage girl who deceives her father so she can go hot-rodding with his Ford Thunderbird. At the end, her father discovers her deception and takes the keys from her. Near the end of the song, the song's narrator suggests that the girl accompany him, so that they may 'have Fun, Fun, Fun' engaging in other activities, 'now that Daddy took the T-Bird away.'

Background and inspiration
The song was written by Brian Wilson and Mike Love. The lyrics are partly inspired by events from Dennis Wilson's life. Russ Titelman recalled that he visited Brian while he was working on the song, and that its original lyric was "Run, Run, Run".

According to Salt Lake City radio manager Bill "Daddy-O" Hesterman of KNAK, an early promoter of the Beach Boys who brought them to Utah for appearances and concerts, the song was inspired by an incident involving Shirley Johnson, the station owner's daughter. Johnson had borrowed her father's 1963 Thunderbird, which had a University of Utah parking sticker, ostensibly to go study at the University library. Instead, she went to Shore's Drive In, a hamburger shop on the corner of 33rd South and 27th East. When the deception came to light, her driving privileges were revoked. In 2007, Johnson told KSL News that she was complaining loudly about the incident at the radio station, where she worked as a part-time secretary, when the Beach Boys happened to be there for an interview. Hesterman said that Wilson and Love, amused by the incident, jotted down the beginnings of the song as he took them to the airport that afternoon.

The opening electric guitar introduction of the song was based on Chuck Berry's "Johnny B. Goode", and the track's punctuated drum fills were inspired by the work of Phil Spector. Musicologist Philip Lambert noted that the initial two phrases of the song are based on almost the same chord progression as the first two phrases of "Da Doo Ron Ron", and are melodically similar.

Recording
The song was recorded on January 1, 1964, at United Western Recorders Studio 3. Vocals and additional overdubs followed on either January 8 or 9. An earlier session was cancelled by band manager Murry Wilson, as he had felt dissatisfied with the song. Brian rescheduled the session after discovering what happened.

The stereo and mono mixes stem from the same recording but have a significant difference: the fadeout on the stereo mix fades out early into the song's outro, with the instruments fading away before the vocals (and an overdubbed drum part). The mono mix, as heard on the 45 as well as mono copies of Shut Down Volume 2 has an extended outro.

Release
The "Fun, Fun, Fun" single backed with "Why Do Fools Fall In Love?" was released in the United States in February 1964. Cash Box described it as "a contagious steady rock beat" song with a "great teen arrangement." The single peaked at the number 5 spot on the Billboard chart. In the United Kingdom, the single was released in March 1964 through Capitol Records, but failed to chart.

In Australia, the single peaked at the number 6 position, which was the band's highest charting single in Australia at that time. In West Germany, the single became their first single to chart in the country when it peaked at the number 49 position. According to various national charts published in Billboard through the 1960s, the single peaked at number 4 in The Philippines (February 1965) with thirteen weeks in its top 10, and spent four weeks at number 3 in Hong Kong (December 1965) with ten weeks in its top 10.

Status Quo version

The song was covered in 1996 by the then-current lineups of the Beach Boys and Status Quo, with a new verse written for the song. The Beach Boys sang mainly backing vocals, with Status Quo's Francis Rossi performing the lead vocal for the entire song, except the new verse, which was sung by Mike Love. It was released under PolyGram Records as a single in the United Kingdom. The single, featuring another artist on the B-side, peaked at number 24 on the UK Singles Chart.

Personnel
Track details courtesy of session archivist Craig Slowinski.

The Beach Boys
 Al Jardine – harmony and backing vocal, bass guitar, rhythm guitar
 Mike Love – lead and bass vocal
 Brian Wilson – harmony and backing vocal, producer, piano, Hammond B3 organ, bass guitar
 Carl Wilson – harmony and backing vocal, lead and rhythm guitars
 Dennis Wilson – harmony and backing vocal, drums

Additional musicians
 Hal Blaine – tambourine, additional drums
 Steve Douglas – tenor saxophones
 Jay Migliori – baritone saxophones
 Ray Pohlman – 6-string electric bass guitars

Charts

References

1964 singles
1964 songs
1996 singles
American power pop songs
The Beach Boys songs
Capitol Records singles
Ford Thunderbird
Jan and Dean songs
Leif Garrett songs
PolyGram singles
Song recordings produced by Brian Wilson
Song recordings produced by Pip Williams
Songs about cars
Songs written by Brian Wilson
Songs written by Mike Love
Status Quo (band) songs
Songs based on actual events